Liz Natalia Peña Vargas (born 15 June 1995), sometimes known as Natalia Peña, is a Paraguayan footballer who plays as a forward for Libertad/Limpeño. She was a member of the Paraguay women's national team.

International career
Peña played for Paraguay at senior level in the 2018 Copa América Femenina.

International goals
Scores and results list Paraguay's goal tally first

Honours

Club
Sportivo Limpeño
Copa Libertadores Femenina: 2016

References

1995 births
Living people
Women's association football forwards
Paraguayan women's footballers
Paraguay women's international footballers
Cerro Porteño players